24 Hours (24 sata) is a Croatian anthology film released in 2002. The film is made up of two segments, Sigurna kuća, directed by Kristijan Milić, and Ravno do dna, directed by Goran Kulenović.

References

External links
 

2002 films
2000s Croatian-language films
Croatian anthology films